Victor Romfors (born January 26, 1994) is a Swedish ice hockey player. He is currently playing with HV71 of the Swedish Hockey League (SHL).

Romfors made his first appearance with HV71 during the 2013–14 European Trophy. On February 8, 2104, Romfors made his Swedish Hockey League regular season debut, playing with HV71 during the 2013–14 SHL season.

References

External links

1994 births
HV71 players
Living people
Swedish ice hockey forwards